Tatarovo is a rural locality (a selo) in Borisoglebskoye Rural Settlement, Muromsky District, Vladimir Oblast, Russia. The population was 326 as of 2010. There are 4 streets.

Geography 
Tatarovo is located 39 km north of Murom (the district's administrative centre) by road. Nula is the nearest rural locality.

References 

Rural localities in Muromsky District